Lykens is an unincorporated community located in the town of Balsam Lake, Polk County, Wisconsin, United States.Lykens Lake is a 20 acre lake located in Polk County. It has a maximum depth of 10 feet.

Notes

Unincorporated communities in Polk County, Wisconsin
Unincorporated communities in Wisconsin